Great Hope Baptist High School (Chesapeake, Virginia) is a private Christian high school in Chesapeake, Virginia. There are approximately 100 students.  The school's mascot is a soldier and the school colors are red, white, and blue.

1969 establishments in Virginia
Baptist schools in the United States
Christian schools in Virginia
Educational institutions established in 1969
Private high schools in Virginia
Schools in Chesapeake, Virginia